The Teleférico de Madrid, or Madrid Cable Car, is a gondola lift in the Spanish capital city of Madrid. The line was built by Von Roll and opened in 1969. It uses 72 six-seater cabins, which take 11 minutes to travel the full length of the line.

References

External links
 
 Teleférico de Madrid web site

Gondola lifts in Spain
Transport in Madrid
1969 establishments in Spain